The General Jewish Labour Bund in Lithuania, Poland and Russia, generally called The Bund (cognate to) or the Jewish Labour Bund, was a secular Jewish socialist party initially formed in the Russian Empire and active between 1897 and 1920. In 1917 the Polish part of the Bund, which dated to the times when Poland was a Russian territory, seceded from the Russian Bund and created a new Polish General Jewish Labour Bund which continued to operate in Poland in the years between the two world wars. The majority faction of the Russian Bund was dissolved in 1921 and incorporated into the Communist Party. Other remnants of the Bund endured in various countries. A member of the Bund was called a Bundist.

Founding
The "General Jewish Labour Bund in Russia and Poland" was founded in Vilna on October 7, 1897. The name was inspired by the General German Workers' Association. The Bund sought to unite all Jewish workers in the Russian Empire into a united socialist party, and also to ally itself with the wider Russian social democratic movement to achieve a democratic and socialist Russia. The Russian Empire then included Lithuania, Latvia, Belarus, Ukraine and most of present-day Poland, areas where the majority of the world's Jews then lived. They hoped to see the Jews achieve a legal minority status in Russia. Of all Jewish political parties of the time, the Bund was the most progressive regarding gender equality, with women making up more than one-third of all members.

The Bund actively campaigned against anti-Semitism. It defended Jewish civil and cultural rights and rejected assimilation. However, the close promotion of Jewish sectional interests and support for the concept of Jewish national unity (klal yisrael) was prevented by the Bund's socialist universalism. The Bund avoided any automatic solidarity with Jews of the middle and upper classes and generally rejected political cooperation with Jewish groups that held religious, Zionist or conservative views. Even the anthem of the Bund, known as "the oath" (Di Shvue in Yiddish), written in 1902 by S. Ansky, contained no explicit reference to Jews or Jewish suffering.

At the heart of the vision of the future of the Bund was the idea that there is no contradiction between the national aspect on the one hand and the socialist aspect on the other, as a strictly secular organization, the Bund renounced the Holy Land and the sacred language (Hebrew) and chose to speak Yiddish.

After Kremer and Kossovsky were arrested, a new party leadership emerged. A new central committee was set up under the leadership of Dovid Kats (Taras). Other key figures in the new party leadership were Leon Goldman, Pavel (Piney) Rozental and Zeldov (Nemansky). The 2nd Bund conference was held in September 1898. The 3rd Bund conference was held in Kovno in December 1899. John Mill had returned from exile to attend the conference, at which he argued that the Bund should advocate for Jewish national rights. However, Mill's line did not win support from the other conference delegates. The 3rd conference affirmed that the Bund only struggled for civil, not national, rights.

In 1901, the word "Lithuania" was added to the name of the party.

The Bund's membership grew to 900 in Łódź and 1,200 in Warsaw in the fall of 1904.

During the period of 1903–1904, the Bund was harshly affected by Czarist state repression. Between June 1903 and July 1904, 4,467 Bundists were arrested and jailed.

In its early years, the Bund had remarkable success, gaining an estimated 30,000 members in 1903 and an estimated 40,000 supporters in 1906, making it the largest socialist group in the Russian Empire.

As part of the Russian Social Democracy
Given the Bund's secular and socialist perspective, it opposed what it viewed as the reactionary nature of traditional Jewish life in Russia. Created before the Russian Social Democratic Labor Party (RSDLP), the Bund was a founding collective member at the RSDLP's first congress in Minsk in March 1898. Three out of nine delegates at the Minsk congress were from the Bund, and one of three members of the first RSDLP Central Committee was a Bundist. For the next 5 years, the Bund was recognized as the sole representative of the Jewish workers in the RSDLP, although many Russian socialists of Jewish descent, especially outside of the Pale of Settlement, joined the RSDLP directly.

At the RSDLP's second congress in Brussels and London in August 1903, the Bund's autonomous position within the RSDLP was rejected under pressure by the Bolsheviks and the Bund's representatives left the Congress, the first of many splits in the Russian social democratic movement in the years to come. The five representatives of the Bund at this Congress were Vladimir Kossowsky, Arkadi Kremer, Mikhail Liber, Vladimir Medem and Noah Portnoy.

During this period two trade unions, the Union of Bristle-Makers (Bersther-Bund) and the Union of Tanners (Garber-Bund), were affiliated to the Bund. In its report to the 1903 Russian Social Democratic Labour Party congress, the Bund claimed to have district organizations in Vilna (Sventiany, etc.), Kovno (Ponevezh, Vilkomir, Shavli, Onikshty, Keydany, Yanovo, Shaty, Utena...), Grodno (Kartuz-Bereza, etc.), Białystok, Dvinsk (Rezhitsa ...), Minsk (Borisov, Pinsk, Mozyr, Bobruisk, Parichi ...), Vitebsk (Beshankovichy, Liozna, Lyady ...), Warsaw, Łódź, Siedlce, Płock, Suwałki, Mariampol, Gomel (Dobryanyka, Vietka ...), Mogilev (Shklow, Orsha, Bykhov, Kopys ...), Zhytomyr, Berdichev, Odessa, Nizhyn, Bila Tserkva, Podolian Governorate (Vinnitsa, Bratslav, Tulchina, Nemirov), Lutsk, Volhynian Governorate, as well as the districts of the Union of Bristle-Makers; Nevel, Kreslavka, Vilkovyshki, Kalvaria, Vladislavovo, Verzhbolovo, Vystinets, Trostyan, Knyszyn, and the districts of the Union of Tanners; Smorgon, Oshmyany, Krynki, Zabludovo, etc.

Per Vladimir Akimov's account of the history of social democracy 1897–1903, there were 14 local committees of Bund – Warsaw, Łódź, Belostok, Grodno, Vilna, Dvisnk, Kovno, Vitebsk, Minsk, Gomel, Mogilev, Berdichev, Zhitomir, Riga. Per Akimov's account the local committees had six types of councils; trade councils (fakhoye skhodki), revolutionary groups, propaganda councils, councils for intellectuals, discussion groups for intellectuals and agitators' councils. The Bristle-Makers Union and Tanners Union had committee status. Bund had organizations that weren't full-fledged committees in Pinsk, Sedlice, Petrokov, Płock, Brest-Litovsk, Vilkomir, Priluki, Rezhitsa, Kiev, Odessa, Bobruisk, and many smaller townships.

4th conference
The 4th Bund conference was held in Białystok in April 1901. The main topic of debate of the 4th Bund conference was the expansion of the Bund into Ukraine and building alliances with existing Jewish labour groups there. The 4th conference reversed the line of the 3rd conference and adopted a line of demanding Jewish national autonomy.

5th conference
The fifth conference of the Bund met in Zürich in June 1903. Thirty delegates took part in the proceedings, representing the major city branches of the party and the Foreign Committee. Two issues dominated the debates; the upcoming congress of the RSDLP and the national question. During the discussions, there was a division between the older guard of the Foreign Committee (Kossovsky, Kremer and John (Yosef) Mill) and the younger generation represented by Medem, Liber and Raphael Abramovitch. The younger group wanted to stress the Jewish national character of the party. No compromise could be reached, and no resolution was adopted on the national question.

1905 Revolution and its aftermath
In February 1905, by a decision of the 6th Bund conference held in Dvinsk, a Polish District Committee was formed; gathering the local party branches in the areas of Congress Poland (covering 10 governorates, but not including the two main centres of Bundist activity in Poland: the cities of Warsaw and Łódz).

In the Polish areas of the Russian empire, the Bund was a leading force in the 1905 revolution. At that time, the organization probably reached the height of its influence. It called for an improvement in living standards, a more democratic political system and the introduction of equal rights for Jews. At least in the early stages of the first Russian Revolution, the armed groups of the "Bund" were likely the strongest revolutionary force in Western Russia. During the following years, the Bund went into a period of decay. The party tried to concentrate on labour activism around 1909–1910 and led strikes in ten cities. The strikes resulted in a deepened backlash for the party, and as of 1910 there were legal Bundist trade unions in only four cities, Białystok, Vilnius, Riga and Łódź. Total membership in Bundist unions was around 1,500. At the time of the eighth party conference only nine local branches were represented (Riga, Vilnius, Białystok, Łódź, Bobruisk, Pinsk, Warsaw, Grodno and Dvinsk) with a combined membership of 609 (out of whom 404 were active).

The Bund formally rejoined the RSDLP when all of its faction reunited at the Fourth (Unification) Congress in Stockholm in April 1906, with the support of the Mensheviks, but the RSDLP remained fractured along ideological and ethnic lines. The Bund generally sided with the party's Menshevik faction led by Julius Martov and against the Bolshevik faction led by Vladimir Lenin during the factional struggles in the run-up to the Russian Revolution of 1917.

The 7th Bund conference was held in Lemberg (Galicia) August 28 – September 8, 1906. The main topic for debate was the relation with the Russian Social Democratic Labour Party. At the time, the Bund had 33,890 members and 274 functioning local organizations.

After the RSDLP finally split in 1912, the Bund became a federated part of the Russian Social Democratic Labour Party (Menshevik) (by this time the Mensheviks had accepted the idea of a federated party organization).

Parliamentary representation
At the 1906 First Duma elections, the Bund made an electoral agreement with the Lithuanian Labourers' Party (Trudoviks), which resulted in the election to the Duma of two (apparently non-Bundist) candidates supported by the Bund: Dr. Shmaryahu Levin for the Vilna province and Leon Bramson for the Kovno province. In total, there were twelve Jewish deputies in the Duma, falling to three in the Second Duma (February 1907 to June 1907), two in the Third Duma (1907–1912) and again three in the fourth, elected in 1912, none of them being affiliated to the Bund.

Political outlook
The Bund eventually came to strongly oppose Zionism, arguing that emigration to Palestine was a form of escapism. The Bund did not advocate separatism. Instead, it focused on culture, rather than a state or a place, as the glue of Jewish "nationalism". In this they borrowed extensively from the Austro-Marxist school, further alienating the Bolsheviks and Lenin. The Bund also promoted the use of Yiddish as a Jewish national language and to some extent opposed the Zionist project of reviving Hebrew.

The Bund won converts mainly among Jewish artisans and workers, but also among the growing Jewish intelligentsia. It led a trade union movement of its own. It joined with the Poalei Zion (Labour Zionists) and other groups to form self-defense organisations to protect Jewish communities against pogroms and government troops. During the Russian Revolution of 1905 the Bund headed the revolutionary movement in the Jewish towns, particularly in Belarus and Ukraine.

Importance of Yiddish
The Bund recognized the Yiddish language as a social identifier. To maintain its national-cultural autonomy, the Bund advocated for the Polish Jewish minority to use its own language and maintain its cultural institutions in areas where it was considered a sizable portion of the local population.

As a Germanic language, Yiddish also helped maintain the Bund's European identity. This can be compared to the anti-Yiddish campaign taking place in Palestine during the early twentieth century, where Yiddish newspapers were banned and physical attacks took place against Yiddish speakers.

The Bund had a major role in maintaining and developing Yiddish, including Yiddish literature and other secular cultural uses of the language. The Bund was the first political party to publish a Yiddish paper – Der yidisher arbeyter – in tsarist Russia in 1896.

Activities abroad
Less than a year after the founding of the party, its Foreign Committee was set up in Geneva. Also within the same timespan, Bundist groups began to constitute themselves internationally. However, the Bund did not construct any world party (as did Poalei Zion). On the contrary, the Bund argued that it was a party for action inside the Russian empire. The Bundist groups abroad were not included into the party structures. In 1902, a United Organization of Workers' Associations and Support Groups to the Bund Abroad was founded. The groups affiliated to the United Organization played an important role in raising funds for the party.

Between 1901 and 1903, the Foreign Committee was based in London.

The United Organization, the Foreign Committee as well as the Union of Russian Social Democrats Abroad were all dissolved at the time of the Russian revolution of 1917.

Separation of the Polish Bund
When Poland fell under German occupation in 1914, contact between the Bundists in Poland and the party centre in St. Petersburg became difficult. In November 1914 the Bund Central Committee appointed a separate Committee of Bund Organizations in Poland to run the party in Poland. Theoretically the Bundists in Poland and Russia were members of the same party, but in practice the Polish Bundists operated as a party of their own. In December 1917 the split was formalized, as the Polish Bundists held a clandestine meeting in Lublin and reconstituted themselves as a separate political party.

Revolutions of 1917

The Bund was the only Jewish party that worked within the soviets. Like other socialist parties in Russia, the Bund welcomed the February Revolution of 1917, but it did not support the October Revolution in which the Bolsheviks seized power. Like Mensheviks and other non-Bolshevik parties, the Bund called for the convening of the Russian Constituent Assembly long demanded by all Social Democratic factions. The Bund's key leader in Petrograd during these months was Mikhail Liber, who was to be roundly denounced by Lenin. With the Russian Civil War and the increase in anti-Semitic pogroms by nationalists and Whites, the Bund was obliged to recognise the Soviet government and its militants fought in the Red Army in large numbers.

At the time of the 1917 upheavals, Mikhail Liber was elected president of the Bund.

The 10th conference of the Bund was held in Petrograd April 14–17, 1917. It was the first Bund conference to be held openly inside Russia. 63 delegates had decisive voting rights at the conference, 20 had consultative votes. Isaiah Eisenstadt (Yudin), Arn Vaynshteyn (Rakhmiel), Mark Liber, Henrik Erlich and Moisei Rafes were the delegates of the Central Committee at the conference. The Brushworkers' Union had two delegates. The other delegates with decisive votes represented 37 cities across the country – three delegates each from Vitebsk, Minsk, Mohilev, Kiev, Kharkov, Petrograd (including Max Weinreich), Moscow (including Aleksandr Zolotarev), Yekaterinoslav, two delegates each from Odessa, Berdichev, Gomel, Kremenchuk, Nizhny Novgorod and one delegate each from Slutsk, Bobruisk, Gorodok, Nevel, Polotsk, Smolensk, Zhitomir, Mariupol, Bakhmut, Alexandrovsk, Simferopol, Rostov-on-Don, Kazan, Tambov, Samara, Baku, Tomsk/Novonikolayevsk, Saratov, Ufa, Novomoskovsk, Bogorodsk, Voronezh, and Rivne.

In May 1917, a new Central Committee of the Bund was formed, consisting of Goldman, Erlich, Medem, and Jeremiah Weinsthein. One Central Committee member, Medem, was in Poland at the time and could not travel to Saint Petersburg to meet with the rest of the committee.

Four Bund bureaus were represented as such among the 60 delegates to the May 1918 Menshevik Party conference: Moscow (Abramovich), Northern (Erlich), Western (Goldshtein, Melamed), and Occupied Lands (Aizenshtadt).

The political changes at the time of the Russian revolution resulted in splits in the Bund. In Ukraine, Bund branches in cities like Bobruisk, Ekaterinoburg and Odessa had formed 'leftwing Bund groups' in late 1918. In February 1919, these groups (representing the majority in the Bund in Ukraine) adopted the name Communist Bund (Kombund), re-constituting themselves as an independent party. Moisei Rafes, who had been a leading figure of the Bund in Ukraine, became the leader of the Ukrainian Kombund. The Communist Bund supported the Soviet side in the Russian Civil War. Other members of the Bund (representing the minority in the Bund in Ukraine) at the end of 1918 formed the Social Democratic Bund (Bund-SD). Leaders of the Ukrainian Social Democratic Bund – Sore Foks, A. Litvak, David Petrovsky (Lipets) openly opposed the communist ideology and policy of confiscation of property, usurpation of political power, arrests and persecution of political opponents.

The Bund also had elected officials at the local level. During the 1917 October Revolution and Russian Civil War, the mayor of the predominantly Jewish Ukrainian town of Berdychiv (53,728 inhabitants, 80% of whom were Jewish at the 1897 census) was a Bundist, David Petrovsky (Lipets).

11th Bund conference
The 11th Bund conference was held in Minsk on March 16–22, 1919, with delegates from Great Russia, Belorussia, Ukraine, Latvia and Lithuania. The conference was marked by a sharp division in the party, with a sector of the Bund being increasing in line with the Bolsheviks. There were 48 delegates with decisive voting rights and 19 with consultative vote. The delegates with decisive votes represented Minsk 5 delegates, Vilna 5, Gomel 5, Baranavichy 4, Bobruisk 2, Kiev 2, Yekaterinoslav 2, Kletsk 2, Nyasvizh 2 and one each from Kharkov, Riga, Moscow, Mohyliv, Konotop, Kurenets, Haradok, Shklow, Ufa/Samara, Smolensk, Rechytsa, Penza, Igumen, Mozyr, Pukhavichy, Ivianiec, Voronezh, Vitebsk and Dvinsk.

In Latvia
The first local Bund organizations in Latvia had been established on 1900 in Daugavpils and on 1902 in Riga. In the autumn of 1904, the Riga Committee of the Latvian Social Democratic Workers Party and the Riga Committee of the Bund signed a co-operation agreement and founded the Riga Federative Committee. The main liaisons were the engineer Jānis Ozols ("Zars") and the railwayman Samuel Klevansky ("Maksim"). Bund was active during the 1905 Russian revolution, organizing demonstrations and fighting units.

In December 1918 the Latvia District Committee of the Bund began publishing the newspaper Undzer Tsayt ('Our Time'). As Latvia declared independence, the Bund held the position that Latvian independence should only be a temporary solution and that the area should eventually become part of a democratic socialist Russia. The Bund obtained two seats in the People's Council of Latvia, represented by A. Sherman and M. Papermeister. Moreover, the party obtained four seats in the provisional city council of Riga.

In 1919, a separate Latvian Bund party was formed.

Bund and the Central Rada of Ukraine
After the issuing of the First Universal of the Central Rada (Council) of Ukraine, the Southern Bureau of the Bund issued a statement rejecting the declaration of Ukrainian autonomy. The Bund feared that minorities, such as the Jews, would suffer if a centralized Ukrainian state emerged. Rather the Bund proposed that the Russian Provisional Government convene an all-Ukrainian territorial conference with representatives of both the Rada and non-Ukrainian forces, to establish an autonomous administration.

Bund and the Belorussian People's Republic
The Bund was among the political parties that participated in the Rada (Council) of the Belorussian People's Republic, which declared independence in 1918 on territories occupied by the German Imperial Army. During the March 24–25, 1918 session of the Rada, the Bund argued against declaring independence from Russia. Bund member Mojżesz Gutman became a Minister without portfolio in the government of the newly created republic and drafted its constitution. The Bund later left the government bodies of the Belorussian People's Republic.

Gomel conference

The remainder Bund in Russia its 12th conference on April 12–19, 1920 in Gomel, where the majority adopted a communist position and the anti Bolshevik minority reconstituted themselves as separate party (the Bund (S.D.)).

The fourteen point of the resolution "On the Present Situation and the Tasks of Our Party" of the Gomel conference stated that
Summing up the experience of the last year, the Twelfth Conference of the Bund finds:
 that the Bund, in principle, had adopted the communist platform since the Eleventh Conference,
 that the Programme of the Communist Party, which is also the programme of the Soviet government, corresponds with the fundamental platform of the Bund,
 that a ’united socialist front’ with principled opponents of Soviet power, who draw a line between the proletariat and its government, is impossible,
 that the moment has come when the Bund can relinquish its official oppositional stand and take upon itself responsibility for the Soviet government's policy.

The resolution on organisational questions stated that
The logical consequence of the political stand adopted by the Bund is the latter's entry into the [Russian Communist Party] on the same basis as the Bund's membership of the R.S.D.L.P.. The conference authorised the C.C. of the Bund to see to it, as an essential condition, that the Bund preserve within the R.C.P. the status of an autonomous organisation of the Jewish proletariat.

Dissolution of the Bund in Lithuania
In Lithuania, the majority of the Bund had become communists and at a conference held in Kaunas April 18–19, 1921 the Bund organization in Lithuania was declared dissolved and its members encouraged to join the Communist Party of Lithuania. The anti-communist minority of the party in Lithuania abandoned Bundist politics altogether.

Unity talks and dissolution
Esther Frumkin and Aron Isaakovich (Rakhmiel) Vainsthein were the key leaders of the Communist Bund 1920–1921. Communist Bund organs, such as Der Veker, were published irregularly in Belorussia.

Following the Gomel Conference, a process of negotiations for a merger between the Communist Party and the Communist Bund took place. As noted above, the Communist Bund argued that it should be affiliated as an autonomous organization within the Communist Party on the same terms as the Bund had joined the Russian Social Democratic Labour Party in 1903. Furthermore, the Bund demanded that a commission be set up to discuss the terms of the merger. The Communist Party ceded to this request and a 7-member commission was formed (3 Communist Party representatives, 3 Bund representatives and 1 Comintern representative as arbiter). On May 6, 1920, the Politburo of the Central Committee of the Russian Communist Party (bolshevik) discussed the question of "The Conditions for the Bund's Admission to Membership of the R.C.P." and resolved "that Kamenev, Stalin and Preobrazhensky be authorised to receive the representatives of the Bund and hear their proposals". Within the Communist Party, its Jewish section (Yevsektsiya) strongly opposed the Bund and argued against allowing the Bund to form an autonomous body within the party.

On June 9, 1920, the communist faction of the Fareynikhte party merged into the Communist Bund.

Eventually the Comintern arbiter in the unity commission was convinced by the Yevsektsiya argumentation, and the Comintern ordered the Bund to dissolve itself. At an Extraordinary All-Russian Bundist Conference, held in Minsk on March 5, 1921, the delegates representing some 3,000 party members debated disbanding the Communist Bund. Vainsthein spoke in favour of disbanding the Communist Bund and merging with the Communist Party. Perel represented the minority view, arguing that the Bund should be retained as a separate party. 47 delegates voted against Perel's proposal, 23 delegates abstained from voting. In April 1921 the Communist International called on all bundists to join the Communist Party. The Communist Bund was subsequently disbanded. In Belorussia, the Communist Party (bolshevik) of Bielorussia agreed to provide automatic party membership to any bundist that joined the party, and one bundist was included in the CP(b)B Central Bureau and two bundists in CP(b)B District Committees. Symbolically marking the merger, a ceremony was held in a theatre in Minsk on April 19, 1921, where bundists handed over their banners to the CP(b)B. Der Veker became the organ of the Yevsektsiya (Jewish section of the Communist Party) in the Belorussian SSR. After their party was dissolved, many former members of the Communist Bund joined the RCP(b) as individuals

Legacy
Around 1923, the remnants of the Bund (S.D.) had ceased to function in Soviet Russia. Many former Bundists, like Mikhail Liber and David Petrovsky, perished during Stalin's purges in the 1930s. The Polish Bundists continued their activities until 1948. During the latter half of the 20th century the Bundist legacy was represented through the International Jewish Labor Bund, a federation of local Bundist groups around the world. A leader of the Warsaw Ghetto Uprising of 1943 was Bundist Marek Edelman.

In West Belarus, areas that came under Polish rule between the two world wars, the remnants of the Russian Bund eventually merged into the Polish Bund, while many activists chose to join the Polish Communist Party.

Former Bundists who became high level officials in the USSR
 Israel Moiseevich Leplevsky (1894–1938), Bundist in 1904–1907, Minister ("People's Commissar") of Internal Affairs of the Ukrainian Soviet Socialist Republic (1937–1938)
 Moisei Leibovits Ruhymovych (1889–1939), Bundist in 1904–1913, Minister ("People's Commissar") for military affairs of the Donetsk-Krivoy Rog Soviet Republic (1917–1918) and Minister ("People's Commissar") for Defense Industry of the USSR (1936–1937)
 David Petrovsky (1886–1937), Bundist in 1902–1919, a Chief of the General Directorate of military educational institutions (GUVUZ) of the Red Army (1920–1924), a member of the Presidium of the Executive Committee of the Communist International (1924–1929), a member of the Presidium to the Supreme Soviet of the National Economy (1929–1932), a Chief of the Department of higher and secondary technical educational institutions (GLAVVTUZ) in the Ministry (People's Commissariat) of Soviet Heavy Industry (1932–1937).

The Bundists in North America

Among the exiled Bundists who went on with Socialist politics in America was Baruch Charney Vladeck (1886–1938), elected to the New York Board of Aldermen as a Socialist in 1917, defeated in 1921 but re-elected in 1937 to the newly formed New York City Council running on the American Labor Party ticket. He was also the manager of The Jewish Daily Forward from 1918 till his death.

Moishe Lewis (1888–1950) was a Bundist leader in his Polish (now Belarusian) hometown Svislosz before he emigrated to Canada in 1922. He was the father of David Lewis (1909–1981), a leader of the New Democratic Party in Canada.

The American Labour leader David Dubinsky (1892–1982), though never formally a member of the party, had joined the bakers' union, which was controlled by the Bund, and was elected assistant secretary within the union by 1906. He made his way to the United States in 1911. He later became a member of the Socialist Party of America, helped found the American Labor Party in 1936 and was from 1932 till 1966 the leader of the International Ladies' Garment Workers' Union.

Between 1913 and 1917, working under the name Max Goldfarb, David Petrovsky (1886–1937) was a member of the Central Committee of the Jewish Socialist Federation of America, a member of the Socialist Party of America, and the labor editor of The Forward.

Sara Szweber (1875–1966) was active in the Bund émigré community and took part in Bund's fourth World Congress at the age of ninety.

See also
 Armenian Social-Democratic Workers Organization – an Armenian organization inspired by the Bund
 The Workers Circle – an American organization inspired by the Bund

References

Further reading
 Jack Jacobs (ed.), Jewish Politics in Eastern Europe: The Bund at 100. New York: New York University Press, 2001.
 Alfred Katz, "Bund: The Jewish Socialist Labor Party", The Polish Review, vol. 10, no. 3 (Summer 1965), pp. 67–74.

External links

 Bund article at The YIVO Encyclopedia of Jews in Eastern Europe
 Algemeyner Yidisher Arbeyter Bund Collection at the International Institute of Social History
 Jewish Workers' Bund Archive at marxists.org

Jewish political parties
Anti-Zionism in Europe
Anti-Zionist political parties
Factions of the Russian Social Democratic Labour Party
Jews and Judaism in the Russian Empire
Jewish Polish history
Jewish Ukrainian history
Socialist parties in Europe
History of socialism
Congress Poland
History of Ukraine (1795–1918)
Political parties of the Russian Revolution
Political parties of minorities in Imperial Russia
Political parties established in 1897
1897 establishments in Poland
1897 establishments in the Russian Empire
1897 establishments in Ukraine
Defunct political parties in Lithuania
Defunct political parties in Ukraine
Defunct socialist parties in Russia
Second International